Suhdulah pur satan is a Gram panchayat in Hajipur in the Indian state of Bihar.

Governance
The panchayat is Bhawan Sadullahpur (पंचायत भवन Sadullahpur )

Transport
The nearest highway is National highway 19.

Villages

References

Gram panchayats in Bihar
Villages in Vaishali district
Vaishali district
Hajipur